Blennocampinae is a subfamily of common sawflies in the family Tenthredinidae. There are more than 100 genera and 600 described species in Blennocampinae.

Genera
These genera belong to the subfamily Blennocampinae:

 Aethiocampa Pasteels, 1949
 Amonophadnus Rohwer, 1921
 Anisoarthra Cameron, 1876
 Apareophora Sato, 1928
 Aphymatocera Sato, 1928
 Ardis Konow, 1886
 Astethomostus Wei, 1997
 Bavonia Pesarini, 2004
 Belesempria Wei, 1997
 Beleses Cameron, 1877
 Bensoniana Malaise, 1942
 Blennia Malaise, 1964
 Blennocampa Hartig, 1837
 Blennogeneris MacGillivray, 1923
 Borgenia Togashi, 2009
 Brykella Malaise, 1943
 Bua Wei & Nie, 1998
 Ceratulus Macgillivray, 1908
 Cheilophleps Benson, 1938
 Chevinia Lacourt, 2003
 Cladardis Benson, 1952
 Claremontia Rohwer, 1909
 Condeia Malaise, 1935
 Corcova Malaise, 1964
 Cornaria Malaise, 1964
 Corpilus Malaise, 1937
 Davida Saini & Vasu, 1996
 Dianstethus Wei & Nie, 1998
 Diranga Saini & Vasu, 1997
 Distega Konow, 1904
 Emegatomostethus Wei, 1997
 Esehabachia Togashi, 1984
 Eupareophora Enslin, 1914
 Eurhadinoceraea Enslin, 1920
 Eutomostethus Enslin, 1914
 Genatomostethus Wei & Nie, 2002
 Gussakovskia Malaise, 1935
 Habachia Takeuchi, 1952
 Halidamia Benson, 1939
 Hanumantus Saini, Singh, Singh & Singh, 1985
 Hoplocampoides Enslin, 1914
 Kivua Forsius, 1934
 Kompongia Malaise, 1937
 Lagonis Ross, 1937
 Liuacampa Wei & W. Xiao, 1997
 Loopica Saini & Vasu, 1998
 Lycaota Konow, 1903
 Malaisea Forsius, 1933
 Malkiatus Smith, 2006
 Masaakia Takeuchi, 1950
 Megatomostethus Takeuchi, 1933
 Meliniola Malaise, 1935
 Metaneura Malaise, 1950
 Metapedias Enderlein, 1920
 Monardis Benson, 1952
 Monardoides Wei Meicai & Wu Weiwen, 1998
 Monophadnoides Ashmead, 1898
 Monophadnus Hartig, 1837
 Neoclia Malaise, 1937
 Nervobeleses Wei, Nie & Taeger, 2006
 Nesotomostethus Rohwer, 1910
 Niea Wei, 1998
 Nipponocampa Okutani, 1972
 Nipponostethus Togashi, 1997
 Notodontidea Wei Meicai, 1996
 Obtusia Malaise, 1964
 Onychostethomostus Togashi, 1984
 Parabeleses Wei & Nie, 1998
 Paracharactus MacGillivray, 1908
 Paramasaakia Ermolenko, 1971
 Pareophora Konow, 1886
 Pasteelsia Malaise, 1964
 Pedicellidea Malaise, 1964
 Periclista Konow, 1886
 Phymatocera Dahlbom, 1835
 Phymatoceridea Rohwer, 1916
 Phymatoceriola Sato, 1928
 Phymatoceropsis Rohwer, 1916
 Pseudopareophora Wei & Nie, 1998
 Revatra Wei & Nie, 1998
 Rhadinoceraea Konow, 1886
 Rya Malaise, 1964
 Salatigia Enslin, 1911
 Selandriopsis Costa, 1875
 Senoclidea Rohwer, 1912
 Siniara Malaise, 1964
 Songyuna Wei Meicai & Nie Haiyan, 1998
 Stenocampa Wei & Nie, 1997
 Stethomostus Benson, 1939
 Tesslinia Pasteels, 1951
 Tethida Ross, 1937
 Tomostethus Konow, 1886
 Trichotaxonus Rohwer, 1910
 Tridentocampa Wei & Nie, 1998
 Trisodontophyes Pasteels, 1949
 Ulotomostethus Forsius, 1935
 Umegatomostethus Wei, 1997
 Ungulirhadina Wei Meicai, 1997
 Waldheimia Brullé, 1846
 Wuhongia Wei & Nie, 1998
 Yuccacia Wei Meicai & Nie Haiyan, 1998
 Zaphymatocera Sato, 1928
 Zhuana Wei, 1997
 † Durbadnus Pasteels, 1954
 † Synaptoneura Pruvost, 1920
 † Ucona Smith, 1973

References

External links

 

Tenthredinidae